, also known as Maoyu, or Archenemy and Hero in English, is a Japanese light novel series by Mamare Touno that was initially posted in a play format on the textboard 2channel in 2009. Enterbrain published five main novels in the series, in addition to three side-story novels between 2010 and 2012, selling over 450,000 copies in total. It has received several manga adaptations. A 12-episode anime adaptation by Arms aired in Japan from January 5 to March 30, 2013. The series follows the exploits of a human hero and the queen of demons who join forces to bring peace and prosperity to their war-torn world.

Plot

The story is set in a world embroiled by war between Humans and Demons. Inside, the Hero discovers that the Demon King is in fact a Demon Queen; and instead of battling him, the Demon Queen proposes an alliance with the Hero. She explains how a sudden end to the war can bring further chaos to the world as the Humans, once united to stand against their common enemies, would eventually begin fighting among themselves, with similar issues already occurring in the Demon Realm. Convinced by her words, the Hero joins forces with the Queen, and together they execute a plan to bring prosperity and a lasting peace to both Humans and Demons alike.

Production

Commercial releases
Game designer Shōji Masuda took note of the series and contacted the author on Twitter. This led to the establishment of a project to publish the series commercially as a novel. Masuda acted as the series' publication supervisor, with Atsushi Yamakita and Hiromi Hosoe taking on the role of setting director, Atsushi Yamakita providing extra consulting on map creation, toi8 providing illustrations, with additional character design assistance from Keinojō Mizutama. Besides the novel series, the franchise has received several manga adaptations and drama CDs and a TV anime adaptation, which was broadcast between January and March 2013.

Media

Light novels

Manga
The manga series "Become Mine, Hero" "I Refuse!" was published in English digitally by Kadokawa Shoten, with the first two volumes made available on BookWalker on December 24, 2014. First 16 volumes were released.
Yen Press had licensed the manga and planned to release it in a digital format.

Anime

A 12-episode anime television series adaptation, directed by Takeo Takahashi and produced by Arms, aired in Japan on January 5 to March 30, 2013 on Tokyo MX. The screenplay is written by Naruhisa Arakawa and the music is by Takeshi Hama. The anime is streaming by Crunchyroll with English subtitles. Sentai Filmworks has acquired the series for a release in North America, while in Australia it is licensed by Madman Entertainment.

References

External links
Official website 
Official anime website 

2010 Japanese novels
2011 manga
2013 anime television series debuts
2channel
Akita Shoten manga
Anime and manga based on light novels
Arms Corporation
Enterbrain
Enterbrain manga
Fantasy anime and manga
Japanese fantasy novels
Kadokawa Dwango franchises
Kadokawa Shoten manga
Kodansha manga
Light novels
Shōnen manga
Sentai Filmworks
Television shows based on light novels
Yen Press titles